Dry Lake is a natural lake in Codington County, South Dakota, in the United States found at an elevation of .

Dry Lake received its name due to the lake historically being dry.

See also
List of lakes in South Dakota

References

Lakes of South Dakota
Lakes of Codington County, South Dakota